The first season of the American television series The Masked Singer premiered on Fox on January 2, 2019, and concluded on February 27, 2019. The season was won by rapper T-Pain as "Monster", with singer Donny Osmond finishing second as "Peacock", and singer Gladys Knight placing third as "Bee".

Production

Casting was less difficult than executive producer Izzie Pick Ibarra predicted due to her strategy of sending the possible participants sketches of costumes that might be featured during the season. She said many of the celebrities had emotional reactions when presented with the proposed costumes and were excited to reinvent their public image. Potential participants were also shown video of international versions of the show to explain the show's format visually.

The costumes worn by the celebrity contestants were designed by Marina Toybina, a four-time Emmy Award winner. Toybina described the Lion and Monster costumes as her favorites from the first season. The  took the longest to  inspired by The Chronicles of Narnia and Joan of Arc. It was unlike the other eleven costumes as the gemstone-laden mask was sculpted out of clay and coated in gold to give it an " aesthetic." The Monster, meanwhile, was designed around a 360° foam cylinder with built-in vents made of mesh to provide oxygen to the performer. However, during filming, the large eye the celebrity saw out of frequently fogged up due to a lack of air; tiny fans were then installed inside the costume to provide circulation. Fans were also placed inside the full-body Pineapple costume, which was constructed to resemble a Hawaiian surfer on the beach in the summer.

Other costumes, such as the Rabbit and Raven, were inspired by Hollywood movies. Toybina says the majority of costumes turn out identical to her sketches. The former was the result of combining the character Frank from the film Donnie Darko (2001) with Edward Scissorhands (1990) to create a darker, unexpected costume, while the latter was inspired by The Crow (1994). Deer was heavily influenced by steampunk elements and made to resemble "a war soldier trapped in a wood" and Peacock was made to look like an Elvis Presley "showstopper costume" inspired by the glitz of Las Vegas. The small dogs in Beverly Hills inspired Toybina to make the pink Poodle have a Real Housewives diva-like presence with accompanying sunglasses, while her love of hip-hop music inspired her to add LL Cool J-style chains to the Hippo. Unicorn, which was imagined as an ethereal white snow queen, had its horn break off during the filming of an episode. Toybina says she had to "reach for the wire and glue" to fix it backstage.

Filming occurred from June 4 to June 24, 2018. For their work on the tenth and final episode of the season, Toybina and costume supervisor Grainne O'Sullivan received a Creative Arts Emmy Award nomination for Outstanding Costumes for a Variety, Nonfiction, or Reality Programming.

Panelists and host

The panelists consisted of singer-songwriter Robin Thicke, television personality Jenny McCarthy Wahlberg, actor and comedian Ken Jeong, and recording artist Nicole Scherzinger. Nick Cannon hosted the show.

Throughout the season, various guest panelists appeared as the fifth panelist in the judging panel for one or two episodes. These guest panelists included actor and comedian Joel McHale in the third and fourth episodes, actor and comedian J. B. Smoove in the seventh episode, and comedian Kenan Thompson in the eighth and tenth episodes.

Contestants
The competitors were said to have a combined 65 Grammy nominations, 16 multi-Platinum albums, 16 Emmy nominations, nine Broadway shows, four Super Bowl titles, and four stars on the Hollywood Walk of Fame.

Episodes

Week 1 (January 2)

Week 2 (January 9)

Week 3 (January 16)

Week 4 (January 23)

Week 5 (January 30)

Group number: "On Top of the World" by Imagine Dragons

Week 6 (February 6)

Group number: "I Gotta Feeling" by The Black Eyed Peas

Week 7 (February 13)

Week 8 (February 20)

Week 9 (February 27) – Finale
 Group number: "Make Way" by Aloe Blacc

Reception

Critical response
The premiere episode received mixed reviews. Vulture felt that the series was more entertaining, yet "weirder, sillier, and stupider" than other U.S. music competition programs, and described the format as having the "vibe" of "what if [Philadelphia Flyers mascot] Gritty walked out on a soundstage made to look like an arena concert, belted out Sam Smith's 'Stay With Me,' was described as 'a professional' by Jenny McCarthy Wahlberg, took off his head to reveal he was Joey Fatone, and the entire experience felt three clicks away from an episode of Black Mirror?" The panelists were considered to be "weak" and "[approaching] their jobs with all the insight and acumen of an America's Next Top Model contestant trying to decipher the Tyra Mail", and that the performances were "underwhelming" (using Ryan Reynolds' surprise appearance on the Korean version singing "Tomorrow" in a "low-rent" unicorn mask as a benchmark) due to the contestants not always being singers. However, the format was deemed to have depth for being "a pretty fascinating examination of celebrity culture, mass appeal, performance, image, and fame."

Emily Yahr of The Washington Post described the premiere episode as "one of the craziest reality shows of our time", acknowledging other similar reactions to the series.

Ratings
The show's premiere was the highest rated unscripted television series debut since The X Factor in 2011. Following three days of DVR viewing, the first episode's 18–49 rating grew by 30percent—the highest increase ever for a premiere in the show's genre. Although initially dropping, ratings grew towards the end of the season, and the finale became the most watched episode. According to Comscore, the show had one of the highest viewer engagement levels of any series during the week the finale aired. It concluded the 2018–19 television season as the highest rated new series among adults 18–49, averaging a 2.6rating throughout all ten episodes, and as the highest rated entertainment series among teenagers, men 18–34, adults 18–34, and adults 18–49. The show was the first unscripted series to rank number one in the genre in its first season since Joe Millionaire in 2003, and was one of the reasons why Fox was the only network to gain viewers compared to the previous television season.

References

2019 American television seasons
The Masked Singer (American TV series)